Lip Sync Battle. Ustawka is a Polish reality competition series based on the American show of the same name. It premiered on Player.pl on 27 January 2016. It is hosted by Natalia Jakuła and Piotr Kędzierski.

The concept of lip syncing was introduced on the American chat show Late Night with Jimmy Fallon, in which celebrities battle each other with lip sync performances. It has been used as a recurring segment on The Tonight Show Starring Jimmy Fallon before being developed as a separate show.

Episodes

Season 1 (2016) 
''Winners are listed in bold

References

2010s Polish television series
2016 Polish television series debuts
Polish-language television shows
Musical game shows
Polish television series based on American television series